Chandu the Magician  is a 1932 American pre-Code mystery-fantasy film starring Edmund Lowe as Frank Chandler and Bela Lugosi as the villain Roxor that he must stop. Based on the radio play of the same name, written by Harry A. Earnshaw, Vera M. Oldham and R.R. Morgan. The radio series was broadcast from 1932 to 1933, and Fox obtained the rights hoping the film would appeal to a ready-made audience. In 1934 Chandu returned in a twelve part serial, The Return of Chandu, with Bela Lugosi playing the title role.

Plot
For three years, Frank Chandler has studied eastern magic with the Yogis in India and is now known by his new identity, Chandu. He now has the power to teleport, astral project, mesmerize, as well as project illusions. With these supernatural abilities he has been entrusted by his teacher to "go forth with his youth and strength to conquer the evil that threatens mankind". Chandu is sent to Egypt to deal with an Egyptian megalomaniac known as Roxor, played by Bela Lugosi. Roxor kidnaps Chandu's brother-in-law, Robert Regent, an inventor who has developed a death ray whose beams reach halfway round the world. The evil Roxor plots to use the ray to aid his plans for world domination. Chandu must utilise all his psychic abilities to rescue his brother-in-law, and also his sister and their children, whom Roxor has kidnapped in a plot to force Regent into revealing the secrets of his death ray. Chandu's sweetheart Egyptian Princess Nadji is also kidnapped, leaving Chandu with the quandary whom to rescue first. Using his Yogi abilities, Chandu makes daring escapes, including one from a submerged sarcophagus. Eventually he succeeds in rescuing everyone and mesmerizing Roxor long enough to destroy both the death ray and the villain's entire lair.

Production
William Cameron Menzies who worked as the art director on The Thief of Bagdad (1924), employs every special effect trick of the trade, many miniatures, optical effects, dry for wet to create a visually exciting film.

Cast
Edmund Lowe as Chandu/Frank Chandler
Bela Lugosi as Roxor
Irene Ware as Princess Nadji
Herbert Mundin as Albert Miggles
Henry B. Walthall as Robert Regent
Weldon Heyburn as Abdulah
June Lang as Betty Lou Regent
Michael Stuart as Bobby Regent
Virginia Hammond as Dorothy Regent
Nigel De Brulier as Yogi Teacher (uncredited) 
John George as Bidder (uncredited) 
Charles Stevens as Ali (uncredited)

Critical reception
The New York Times called it "whooping entertainment for the children and a series of naïvely juvenile escapades for the grown-ups".

See also
The Return of Chandu (where Bela Lugosi portrays Chandu)
Bela Lugosi filmography

References

External links

 
 

1932 films
1930s fantasy films
1932 adventure films
1930s mystery films
Fox Film films
American black-and-white films
American fantasy adventure films
American mystery films
Films about magic and magicians
Films directed by William Cameron Menzies
Films directed by Marcel Varnel
1930s English-language films
1930s American films